The Royal Brunei Land Forces (Malay: Tentera Darat Diraja Brunei, abbreviated TDDB) is the land component of the Royal Brunei Armed Forces. The RBLF has responsibility for maintaining the territorial defence of Brunei, both from attack from outsiders, and by assisting the Royal Brunei Police in maintaining law and order.

History
The Royal Brunei Land Forces was formed in May 1961 with the formation of the Brunei Malay Regiment, when the first intake of 60 recruits began training. The formal foundation of the regiment occurred in June 1962 when men of the first three intakes were formed into the regimental headquarters and three rifle companies. In 1965, the regiment received the royal prefix, becoming the Royal Brunei Malay Regiment. Initially stationed at Port Dickson in Malaya, the regiment was soon moved to a purpose built barracks in Brunei itself. The Royal Brunei Malay Regiment established two new units, the Boat Section and the Air Service in 1965 to increase its capabilities further. These two units, together with the infantry, were amalgamated into a single task force in 1966.

In 1972, the regiment's structure was changed, with the infantry, aviation and naval sections split into separate units once again. The infantry companies became the 1st Battalion, Royal Brunei Malay Regiment, with a total of five rifle companies. Three years later, the 2nd Battalion, Royal Brunei Malay Regiment was formed by deamalgamating B and E Companies of the 1st Battalion.

In 1984, Brunei achieved full independence from the United Kingdom. At that time, the Royal Brunei Malay Regiment was renamed as the Royal Brunei Land Forces, part of the wider Royal Brunei Armed Forces. In 1990, the Support Battalion was formed comprising an armoured reconnaissance squadron, air defence battery and combat engineer squadron, together with maintenance and administrative support. In 1994, the 3rd Battalion, Royal Brunei Land Forces was formed from members of D Company, 1st Battalion RBLF and F Company, 2nd Battalion RBLF, while the air defence battery and engineering workshop were transferred from the Support Battalion to the Royal Brunei Air Force and the Support Service respectively.

In 9 July 2011, the RBLF conducted trials to replace their DPM BDUs with Digital Disruptive Pattern BDUs under a contract with Force-21 Equipment.

Organisation

The Royal Brunei Land Forces is organised as four separate battalions:
 First Battalion
 Second Battalion
 Third Battalion
 Support Battalion

First Battalion
The First Battalion was established in 1962; the organisation consisted of the first three intakes undertaking basic military training. At the beginning, the organisation was set up in Segenting Camp, Port Dickson, Malaysia. After the development of Berakas Garrison in 1975, the organisation was then changed to the First Battalion Land Force. Under the command of Colonel J. F. Davis, the force consisted of the various departments, including Markas Company, and five Rifle Companies (A, B, C, D and E).

Second Battalion
The Second Battalion was formed on 2 January 1975 at the Bolkiah Garrison. Before this, the Battalion was comprised Company B and E of the First Battalion under the command of the then Commanding Officer, Lieutenant Colonel A.E. Hibbert. The battalion moved to Tutong Camp on 10 May 1976. Following the formation of the Second Battalion, Pengiran Ratna Indera Lieutenant Colonel Pengiran Dato Setia Ibnu bin Pengiran Datu Penghulu Pengiran Haji Apong was then appointed as the commanding officer in charge.

Third Battalion
The Third Battalion was formed and established on 31 May 1994. The battalion was made up of D Company from the First Battalion and F Company of the Second Battalion and the Command Company from the First and Second Battalion. Major Shahlan bin Hidup was the first appointed Commanding Officer in charge of the Battalion. Previously based in Penanjong Garrison, as of 21 June 2007, the Battalion has relocated to a new camp at Lumut in the Belait District.

Support Battalion
The Support Unit was originally established based on five major units; namely an Armoured Reconnaissance Squadron, a Combat Engineer Squadron, an Air Defence Battery, the Penanjong Workshop and Penanjong Garrison Headquarters. It was reorganised on 2 January 1990, and officially established as the Support Battalion, which comprises three major units; namely, an Armoured Reconnaissance Squadron, a Combat Engineer Squadron and the Company Headquarters Support Battalion.

Rank structure

Commissioned Officers
The rank insignia for commissioned officers for the Royal Brunei Land Forces.

Enlisted
Unlike most Commonwealth armed forces, Brunei has maintained 4 warrant officer ranks, used in conjunction with the standard Commonwealth NCO and enlisted personnel and ratings ranks. The following are the rank insignia for enlisted personnel for the Royal Brunei Land Forces.

Equipment

Bases

International ties

United Kingdom

The Royal Brunei Land Forces has significant ties to the British Army, due in no small part to the fact that there is a permanent British garrison in Brunei. Following the Brunei Revolt in 1962, an agreement was signed between Brunei and the United Kingdom that a battalion of Gurkhas would be stationed in the country to protect various British interests, most notably the major oil installations at Seria. The current garrison consists of a battalion of the Royal Gurkha Rifles, plus a flight of helicopters from the Army Air Corps in support. However, Brunei is also used by the British Army in general for training in jungle warfare. The presence of one of the British Army's few significant overseas garrisons provides an opportunity to assist the RBLF in its training.

Other nations
The RBLF maintains close ties with many other nations, both in the South-East Asia region and elsewhere. The RBLF conducts exercises with the Malaysian Army and the Singapore Army on a regular basis. The RBLF has also conducted regular exercises with the armies of both Australia, China, New Zealand, Philippines and Thailand, while the United States Marine Corps conducts annual Cooperation Afloat Readiness and Training (CARAT) in Brunei.

Alliances
  - Brigade of Gurkhas
  - Singapore Armed Forces

References

Works cited

Further reading

External links

Royal Brunei Armed Forces

 
Land Forces
Brunei
1961 establishments in Brunei